Andrew Rogers (born 14 December 1962) is a British journalist and author based in Amsterdam. He is the editor of a number of trade publications (most notably in the superyacht industry), a regular contributor to several more, and has authored or edited a number of books about yachts.

Personal life
Andrew Rogers was born in Ipswich in 1962. He studied history at the University of Leicester and then taught history at the Towers School in Ashford from 1985 until 1990, when he moved to Amsterdam. After a short period of teaching English to foreigners, Rogers founded the company Writewell Quality Text. The company specialises in translations from Dutch to English and the copywriting and editing of English text for publication in trade magazines, books and marketing material.

Rogers is a keen supporter of Ipswich Town Football Club, regularly returning to England to attend games, and a member of Crossroads International Church in Amsterdam.

Journalism and copywriting
Andrew Rogers mainly writes for the Dutch superyacht industry, which, being a highly export-oriented sector, is in constant need of high-end English-language commercial texts. Rogers is a regular contributor to Boat International magazine and has also written for The Superyachts, TheRefit Annual and various other yachting and maritime publications.

As copywriter for Feadship since 1995, Rogers has written countless publications, including its bi-annual Pilot book. He is also the editor of Yacht Valley Magazine, a publication of the Holland Yachting Group, and the Dutch yacht brokerage De Valk's Yacht Magazine. Other clients in the superyacht world include Balk Shipyard, Contest Yachts, Hoek Design, Holland Jachtbouw and Moonen Shipyards.

Rogers also works with major corporations in the Netherlands outside the yachting sphere, providing English language copy and translations for companies such as KLM Royal Dutch Airlines (including the award-winning iFly Magazine), Amsterdam RAI, Apollo Vredestein, Wageningen University and Research Centre, MAB Development and Hoya Netherlands. In addition, he edits the English language edition of Amsterdam Seaports, the magazine of the Port of Amsterdam and three other ports around the North Sea Canal.

Published works
Rogers has written and edited various books related to the yachting industry. His first book was The Feadship Story, published in 1999 by The Yacht Report Group in London, which documents the golden jubilee of one of the leading luxury motoryacht builders in the world. The book was written over a two-year period in co-operation with Frits de Voogt, Bieb de Vries and Margo van Lent, each representing one of the main three families in Feadship, plus Hein Velema and Marjolein Karels-Appelman, who both worked at Feadship at the time (Velema is currently CEO of Fraser Yachts).

Rogers' second book was called Queen of Diamonds: World Cruising and documents the global adventures of this Feadship. It was written in partnership with the yacht’s skipper Ian van der Watt after the two spent a week together in Fort Lauderdale. Rogers' next book, The Making of Patriot, also focused on a specific boat, a motoryacht built at Bloemsma van Breemen and launched in 2003. It describes the process of building Patriot, a motoryacht commissioned by Mark Grosvenor. This led to the next two books, both covering restorations of classic boats by the Dutch businessman Johan van den Bruele. Iduna: The Restoration of a Classic Dutch Yacht was published in 2004, and Lulworth: The Restoration of the Century came out in 2006. The latter was described as one of the best books ever written on a single yacht by Boat International.

In 2011, Rogers co-wrote and edited Voyages of M/Y AlumerciA, which documents the voyages of the eponymous motoryacht (built by Heesen Yachts) between 2001 and 2010. Finally, most recently he edited Building Athos, a book about the creation of the sailing yacht Athos published in 2012.

Bibliography

References

External links
 Iduna: A Classic Dutch Yacht 1939 - information regarding Iduna

1962 births
English male journalists
English writers
Living people
Writers from Ipswich